Plectanocotyle lastovizae is a species of monogenean in the genus Plectanocotyle.

Host and localities
Plectanocotyle lastovizae is a parasite of the gills of the streaked gurnard Chelidonichthys lastoviza (Bonnaterre, 1788). The type locality is off Bouharoun, near Alger, Algeria, in the Mediterranean Sea. Another locality is off Sète, France, Mediterranean Sea.

Etymology
The species was named after its host, Chelidonichthys lastoviza.

References

Animals described in 2022
Polyopisthocotylea
Parasites of fish
Fauna of France
Fauna of Algeria